Olexandr Mishula (born April 18, 1992) is a Ukrainian basketball player who plays for Keravnos of the Cyprus Basketball Division A. He also represents the Ukrainian national basketball team.

International career
Mishula was a member of the Ukrainian national basketball team at the 2014 FIBA Basketball World Cup.

References

1992 births
Living people
2014 FIBA Basketball World Cup players
BC Dnipro players
Kyiv-Basket players
Merkezefendi Belediyesi Denizli Basket players
Point guards
Sportspeople from Dnipro
Ukrainian expatriate basketball people in Turkey
Ukrainian men's basketball players